Robinson Crusoe (released in North America as The Wild Life) is a 2016 Belgian-French 3D computer-animated adventure comedy film directed by Vincent Kesteloot and Ben Stassen and written by Lee Christopher, Domonic Paris and Graham Weldon. The film is loosely based on the 1719 novel Robinson Crusoe by Daniel Defoe, but from the point of view of the island's animals. The film was released in the United States on September 9, 2016. Despite receiving negative reviews from the critics and earning a 17% approval rating on Rotten Tomatoes, Robinson Crusoe was a moderate box office success, grossing $39.5 million worldwide against a budget of $13 million.

Plot
English mapmaker Robinson Crusoe and his pet Airedale Terrier Aynsley have booked passage on a ship to the New World. During a violent storm at night, the two are accidentally locked in the ship's belowdeck along with a pair of spoiled Persian cats, Mal and May, while the crew escapes with their lives. He is knocked unconscious by a Lantern leaving Aynsley mourning over his master.

Regaining consciousness and arriving on the island the next morning, Crusoe begins to look for a way out while the animals of the island, Kiki a kingfisher, an Old Goat named Scrubby, a chameleon named Carmello, a tapir called Rosie, a Pangolin with an Australian accent called Pango, and a parrot called tuesday become secretly worried that The Stranger on the island will murder them. When attacked by Mal and May in a ambush, Aynsley drives them away and Crosoe takes Tuesday aboard the wreckage. Aynsley convinces Mak that he and Crusoe are friends. Mal and May trick the animals of the island into believing Crusoe has murdered Tuesday and have them attack Crusoe. Mal and May go into the ship wreckage and start attacking Tuesday while Aynsley protects him.  In the ensuing chaos, Aynsley is pinned under a door as the remains of the ship begin to catch fire. Tuesday makes it out in time, but Aynsley dies in the explosion. The animals think that Tuesday died in the explosion and mourn his death. Mal and May are thrown out of the ship into the black water and end up stranded on "Curse Island", a little island where all the bugs live.

A soaked Tuesday leads a grieving Crusoe to meet his friends. Scrubby throws a heart attack, but the animals approach the stranger. Slowly but surely, the animals realize that Crusoe is friendly and begin helping him adjust to life on the island. However, Kiki becomes increasingly annoyed by the others' willingness to adapt to Crusoe's lifestyle. Meanwhile, Mal and May manage to get back on the main island and decide to put an end to Crusoe and his friends' easy lives.

While building a home for Crusoe, Tuesday explains to his friends that when he was a little parrot, his family abandoned him when a band of cats started attacking them. The Pirate crew notice that they didn't pay attention to Crusoe when he was trapped inside the belowdeck and begin rowing across the sea for him. Mal and May try to murder Crusoe but are catapulted into a pit full of quicksand and attacked by some wolves. Scrubby teaches Crusoe how to find food and pineapples so they wouldn't starve. When Kiki warns Tuesday about the cats, Tuesday tells her that nothing bad will happen but is soon abducted by a bruised and covered in quicksand Mal and May. Crusoe watches with worry and convinces the other animals to rescue Tuesday.

Mal and May arrive at a nearby Shipwrecked ship and begin torturing Tuesday by telling them their past life. The animals arrive to the rescue and save Tuesday by throwing plates and meat while Mal and May manage to attract herds of other cats during the fight. However, Crusoe accidentally drops a candle causing the whole Shipwrecked ship on fire and the Animals running for their lives. Tuesday encourages the animals to fight for themselves instead of running away in fear which Rosie tries to decline. They all manage to defeat the herd of cats and Mal and May by breaking all of the wooden planks sending a few falling into the murky black water below. Tuesday is able to drive the cats away but his wing gets caught and is unable to get free. Seeing him in trouble, Carmello breaks the wooden plank freeing Tuesday and making him have enough time to escape. Mal and May and the other herd of cats fall into the black water below and are forced to use a broken wooden Watchtower for a raft.

Just before the animals could celebrate, Tuesday notices smoke rising and notices that Crusoe is still trapped under the burning ship. Alarmed, Tuesday flies to the rescue and notices Crusoe trapped under a pile of planks. He is able to free him and they are able to escape from the burning ship. But as they are escaping, a falling wooden plank falls and knocks Crusoe unconscious. The animals are alarmed by this and arrive to help him where Kiki uses a raft as a stretcher and they are able to carry him to safety where the pirate crew nurse him back to health the next morning. Tuesday is able to tell a group of animals about the rescue last night and how Mal and May got defeated leaving them pleased that the cats won't come back to the island. The pirate crew get ready to head back to England but Crusoe convinces them to stay at the island because the animals helped survive and saved him when he was unconscious. They decide to stay when they see the animals in the corner and they head to the animals where Crusoe shares a hug with Tuesday.
 
During the post credits, Mal and May and the other herd of cats holding onto the Watchtower and are found by the wolves who attack them.

Voice cast

Reception

Box office
 the film has grossed $8.0 million in North America and $30.4 million in other territories for a worldwide total of $38.4 million.

In the United States, where the film is marketed as The Wild Life, it was released on 9 September 2016, alongside The Disappointments Room, Sully and When the Bough Breaks, and was projected to gross around $5 million from 2,493 theaters in its opening weekend. It went on to gross $3.4 million in its opening weekend, finishing 5th at the box office. In China, the film was released on 4 October 2016, and has grossed .

Critical response
Critical reaction to Robinson Crusoe was mostly negative. On Rotten Tomatoes, the film has an approval rating of 17%, based on 59 reviews, with an average rating of 4.1/10. The site's critical consensus reads, "The Wild Life uses its classic source material as a half-hearted springboard into a colorfully animated but essentially empty experience that only the youngest of viewers will find at all entertaining." On Metacritic, which assigns a weighted average to reviews, the film has a score of 36 out of 100, based on 17 critics, indicating "generally unfavorable reviews".

Audiences polled by CinemaScore gave the film an average grade of "B−" on an A+ to F scale.

References

External links
 
 
 

2016 films
2016 3D films
2016 computer-animated films
2010s French animated films
Animated comedy films
Animated films based on novels
Animated films about birds
Animated films about lizards
Animated films about cats
Animated films about dogs
Belgian animated films
Belgian children's films
Belgian comedy films
2010s children's animated films
2010s children's comedy films
Lionsgate animated films
French children's films
French comedy films
3D animated films
Fictional parrots
Films directed by Ben Stassen
Films scored by Ramin Djawadi
2016 comedy films
StudioCanal films
StudioCanal animated films
Summit Entertainment films
Summit Entertainment animated films
2010s British films